The 2020 UCI Mountain Bike World Championships was held in Leogang, Austria, from 5–11 October 2020. This was the 31st edition of the most prestigious mountain bike event on the calendar, held annually since 1990.

Medal summary

Men's events

Women's events

Team events

References

UCI Mountain Bike World Championships
UCI Mountain Bike World Championships
Mountain Bike Championships
Cycling in Austria
UCI Mountain Bike World Championships
UCI Mountain Bike World Championships
UCI Mountain Bike World Championships